Soyopa Municipality is a municipality in Sonora in north-western Mexico.

The municipal area is 846.33 km2. and the population was 1,649 in 2000.

Neighboring municipalities are:

Northeast:  Bacanora
South:  Onavas
Southwest:  San Javier
West:  La Colorada
Northwest:  Villa Pesqueira

References

Municipalities of Sonora